Creaserinus hortoni, the Hatchie burrowing crayfish, is a species of crayfish in the family Cambaridae. It is found in western Tennessee and northern Mississippi.

The IUCN conservation status of Creaserinus hortoni is "CR", critically endangered. The species faces an extremely high risk of extinction in the immediate future. The IUCN status was reviewed in 2010.

References

Further reading

 

Cambaridae
Articles created by Qbugbot
Crustaceans described in 1970
Taxa named by Horton H. Hobbs Jr.
Taxa named by Joseph F. Fitzpatrick Jr.